Renee Hykel (born May 31, 1979) is an American rower. She competed in the women's lightweight double sculls event at the 2008 Summer Olympics.

References

External links
 

1979 births
Living people
American female rowers
Olympic rowers of the United States
Rowers at the 2008 Summer Olympics
People from Darby, Pennsylvania
21st-century American women